The 2020–21 New Mexico Lobos men's basketball team represented the University of New Mexico during the 2020–21 NCAA Division I men's basketball season. The Lobos were led by fourth-year head coach Paul Weir and are members of the Mountain West Conference. Due to COVID-19 restrictions within the state of New Mexico, the Lobos did not play any of their home games at their normal home arena The Pit. Their "home" games were played at various different locations outside of the state of New Mexico. They finished the season 6–16, 2–15 in Mountain West play to finish in last place. As the No. 11 seed in the Mountain West tournament, they lost in the first round to Fresno State 77–85.

Prior to the end of the season, the school announced that Weir would not return as head coach. On March 16, the school named former Minnesota head coach Richard Pitino the team's new head coach.

Previous season 
The Lobos finished the 2019–20 season 19–14, 7–11 in Mountain West play to finish in a tie for seventh place. They defeated San Jose State in the first round of the Mountain West tournament before losing in the quarterfinals to Utah State.

Roster

Schedule and results

|-
!colspan=9 style=| Regular season

|-
!colspan=9 style=| Mountain West tournament

Source

References

New Mexico Lobos men's basketball seasons
New Mexico
New Mexico Lobos men's basketball
New Mexico Lobos men's basketball